John Leroy "Roy" Atwell (May 2, 1878 – February 6, 1962) was an American actor, comedian and composer, known for playing characters that mis-deliver their lines or stammer, most notably Doc from Walt Disney's Snow White and the Seven Dwarfs.

Early life
Roy Atwell, son of Joseph Addison Atwell, was born in 1878. He was educated at the Sargent School of Acting.

Atwell was a direct descendant of Joseph Atwell (1754–1834), a Revolutionary War soldier who in 1792 purchased land in the military tract in New York and built a house ("Atwell's Corners") in what is today Pompey Hollow, south of Syracuse, near Cazenovia.

Career

Acting 
Atwell appeared in 34 films between 1914 and 1947. 

As well as his film work, he appeared in several Broadway productions, including The Little Missus, The Mimic World, Oh, My Dear!, The Firefly, Apple Blossoms, and How's Your Health? He was a member of the Fortune Gallo's San Carlo Opera Company.

When Atwell began working on Broadway, he had a role, as a serious actor, in which he was to deliver the following line: "It is spring and all the little birds are twittering in the tree tops." Being new and somewhat on edge, what Atwell actually did say was: "Tis ting and the twits are birdering in the tree flops." Atwell fully expected to be dismissed, but the misdelivered line drew a big laugh from the audience and, after the show was over, he was congratulated and asked to repeat it the next night. His unwitting comedic success caused Atwell to make the change from being a dramatic actor to becoming a comedian.

Composition 
Atwell joined ASCAP in 1957.

He composed the popular song Some Little Bug is Going to Find You and wrote the words to a song called "When a Piece of Toast Climbs Your Bedpost with a Cigar."

Personal life 
He was married three times, to Blanche West (1907-?), Dorothy Young (1913–1916), and Ethel Smith (1916–1936).

Filmography
1922: Don't Get Personal as Horace Kane
1922: Red Hot Romance as Jim Conwell
1922: Grand Larceny as Harkness Boyd
1922: The Heart Specialist as Winston Gates
1922: South of Suva as Marmaduke Grubb
1923: Souls for Sale as Arthur Tirrey
1926: The Outsider as Jerry Sidon
1933: Crashing the Gate (Short)
1933: The Little Broadcast as Announcer
1936: The Harvester as Jake Eben
1937: Varsity Show as Prof. Washburn
1937: Behind the Mike as Vale
1937: Snow White and the Seven Dwarfs as Doc (voice, uncredited)
1939: Honolulu as Bearded Man on Ship (uncredited)
1939: Bridal Suite as Professor Kockerthaler (uncredited)
1942: The Fleet's In as Arthur Sidney
1946: People Are Funny as Mr. Pippensiegal
1946: Gentleman Joe Palooka as Senator Sam H. Smiley
1946: Abie's Irish Rose as Dick Saunders
1947: Where There's Life as Salesman (final film role)

References

External links

Some Little Bug Is Going to Find You 1915 on the Internet Archive

Site dedicated to Roy Atwell

1878 births
1962 deaths
Male actors from New York (state)
American male film actors
American male comedians
American male composers
American composers
American male voice actors
Male actors from Syracuse, New York
20th-century American male actors
Comedians from New York (state)
20th-century American comedians